Viva Cisco Kid is a 1940 American Western film directed by Norman Foster, written by Samuel G. Engel and Hal Long, and starring Cesar Romero, Jean Rogers, Chris-Pin Martin, Minor Watson, Stanley Fields and Nigel De Brulier. It was released on April 12, 1940 by 20th Century Fox.

Plot

Cast 
Cesar Romero as Cisco Kid
Jean Rogers as Joan Allen
Chris-Pin Martin as Gordito
Minor Watson as Jesse Allen
Stanley Fields as Boss
Nigel De Brulier as Moses
Harold Goodwin as Hank Gunther
Francis Ford as Proprietor
Charles Judels as Don Pancho

References

External links
 

1940 films
20th Century Fox films
American Western (genre) films
1940 Western (genre) films
Films directed by Norman Foster
Cisco Kid
American black-and-white films
1940s English-language films
1940s American films